Jaime Matías Carreño Lee-Chong (born 3 March 1997), is a Chilean footballer who plays as a midfielder for Deportes La Serena in the Chilean Primera División.

Club career
Jaime made his debut at U.C. for the first time against Santiago Wanderers in Valparaiso in 2015.
In the first half of 2016, Jaime was consolidated as a starter in the team, with great performances. On April 23, 2016 Jaime gave the victory to U.C. in the "university Clasico", scoring the 2–1. This was his first goal in professionalism.

International career
He got his first call up to the senior Chile squad for a friendly against Paraguay in September 2015.

Personal life
From his maternal line, Carreño is of Chinese descent and the nephew of the former Chile international footballer Óscar Lee-Chong and the cousin of the also footballer Felipe Lee-Chong, son of Óscar.

Honors

Club
Universidad Católica
 Primera División de Chile (4): 2016–C, 2016–A, 2018, 2019
 Supercopa de Chile (2): 2016, 2019

References

External links

1997 births
Living people
Footballers from Santiago
Chilean people of Chinese descent
Chilean footballers
Chilean expatriate footballers
Chile youth international footballers
Chile under-20 international footballers
Club Deportivo Universidad Católica footballers
Everton de Viña del Mar footballers
Oriente Petrolero players
Universidad de Concepción footballers
Deportes La Serena footballers
Chilean Primera División players
Bolivian Primera División players
Chilean expatriate sportspeople in Bolivia
Expatriate footballers in Bolivia
Association football midfielders
People from Santiago Province, Chile